The University of South Carolina Aiken (USCA or USC Aiken) is a public university in Aiken, South Carolina. It is part of the University of South Carolina System and offers undergraduate degree programs as well as master's degrees. Additional graduate courses and degree programs are offered through the University of South Carolina Extended Graduate Campus program. The University of South Carolina Aiken awards baccalaureate degrees in more than 30 major areas of study including the bachelor of science in business administration online through Palmetto College.

Campus 

Academics 
The University of South Carolina Aiken was ranked number 49 among "Regional Universities" in the southern US in the 2023 edition of U.S. News & World Reports guide America's Best Colleges. In 2019, the university was ranked #1 among top public regional colleges in the southern US. The university has frequently been ranked in the top three public regional colleges and has been ranked first eleven times: 2002, 2003, 2006, 2007, 2009, 2010, 2011, 2012, 2013, 2015, 2016, 2017, 2018, 2019 and 2021.

 Accreditation 
The university is accredited by the Southern Association of Colleges and Schools. Many of its programs are accredited by program- or discipline-specific accreditors:
 The School of Education's undergraduate programs in early childhood, elementary, secondary, and special education are accredited by the Council for the Accreditation of Educator Preparation (CAEP). Its graduate program for the M.Ed. in educational technology also is accredited by CAEP.

 The School of Business Administration is accredited by the Association to Advance Collegiate Schools of Business.

 The School of Nursing's program is approved by the South Carolina State Board of Nursing and is accredited by the National League for Nursing Accrediting Commission.

 USC Aiken's master of science in applied clinical psychology degree program is accredited by the Master's in Psychology Accreditation Council (MPAC).

 USC Aiken's department of chemistry and physics is nationally certified by the American Chemical Society. USC Aiken is the smallest university in the state of South Carolina to be nationally certified by the American Chemical Society and one of only nine in the state.

 Students 
As of the fall of 2021, USC Aiken had an undergraduate enrollment of approximately 3,101 undergraduate students and 768 graduate students. Students enjoy a low faculty-to-student ratio of 14:1 and 69% of classes consisting of 20 or fewer students. The university reached record enrollment rates in the fall of 2018.

 Student life 
 Fraternities and sororities 
The Greek system at USC Aiken consists of eight fraternities and seven sororities.  In fall 2021, seven percent of undergraduate men and six percent of undergraduate women were active in USC Aiken's Greek life community.IFC fraternitiesDelta Sigma Phi 2014
Kappa Sigma 
Lambda Chi Alpha 2003
Tau Kappa Epsilon 2008NPHC fraternities 
Alpha Phi Alpha 1993
Kappa Alpha Psi 1988
Phi Beta Sigma
Omega Psi Phi 1977NPHC sororities 
 Alpha Kappa Alpha 1978
 Delta Sigma Theta
 Zeta Phi Beta 1999
 Sigma Gamma Rho 2002CPC sororities'''
 Alpha Omicron Pi 2006
 Phi Mu 1988, recolonized 2003
 Zeta Tau Alpha 2001

 Student publications 
The school newspaper is the weekly Pacer Times, Founded in 1963 as the Rebellaire, physical copies of the Pacer Times were once printed by the Aiken Standard.  The school also has a student-run literary journal, Broken Ink''.

Athletics 

USC Aiken's athletic teams are the Pacers. Competing in intercollegiate sports at the Division II level of the National Collegiate Athletic Association (NCAA), the Pacers have been members of the Peach Belt Conference since the 1990–91 academic year.

The school's sports teams were initially known as the Rebels. The mascot name was changed to Pacers in 1971.

The Pacers compete in ten intercollegiate varsity sports. Men's sports include baseball, basketball, cross country, golf, and soccer; while women's sports include basketball, cross country, soccer, softball, and volleyball. Men's and women's tennis were discontinued at the end of the 2018–19 school year. The Pacers have also formerly offered both a cheerleading program and an award-winning dance team, with a co-ed spirit squad currently featured, instead.

Notable alumni
 Adam Riggs — former Major League Baseball player
 Roberto Hernandez — former 16-year Major League Baseball veteran and two-time all-star
William Garrett Wright — poet and editor

References

External links
 
 Official athletics website

 
Universities and colleges accredited by the Southern Association of Colleges and Schools
Education in Aiken County, South Carolina
Buildings and structures in Aiken, South Carolina
Educational institutions established in 1961
1961 establishments in South Carolina
University of South Carolina Aiken
Public liberal arts colleges in the United States